The Valerian Kuybyshev was a Valerian Kuybyshev-class (92-016, OL400) Soviet/Russian river cruise ship, cruising in the Volga – Neva basin. The ship was built by Slovenské Lodenice at their shipyard in Komárno, Czechoslovakia and entered service in 1976. She was named after prominent Soviet politician Valerian Kuybyshev. At 3,950 tonnes, Valerian Kuybyshev was one of the world's biggest river cruise ships. Her sister ships are Feliks Dzerzhinskiy, Mikhail Frunze, Fyodor Shalyapin, Sergey Kuchkin, Mstislav Rostropovich, Aleksandr Suvorov, Semyon Budyonnyy and Georgiy Zhukov. Valerian Kuybyshev is currently operated by Vodohod, the biggest Russian river cruise line.

She sailed under Russian flag, and her last home port was Nizhny Novgorod.

Features
The ship had two restaurants, two bars, solarium, sauna and a resting area.

See also
 List of river cruise ships

References

External links

 Теплоход "Валериан Куйбышев" 
Project 92-016 

1975 ships
River cruise ships
Ships built in Czechoslovakia